The Delos A. Blodgett House (also known as 8VO4385) is a historic house located at 404 Ridgewood Avenue in Daytona Beach, Florida.

Description and history 

The -story house was completed in 1896 for Delos A. Blodgett and his wife Daisy A. Peck. It was listed on the National Register of Historic Places on August 2, 1993.

Design 
The Delos A. Blodgett House was designed by architect, Sumner Hale Gove in the Queen Anne style.

References

External links 
 

Houses on the National Register of Historic Places in Volusia County, Florida
Buildings and structures in Daytona Beach, Florida
Queen Anne architecture in Florida
Houses completed in 1896